Bhagwati Singh (1932/3 – 4 April 2021) was a politician and founder of the Samajwadi Party and a member of the Parliament of India representing Uttar Pradesh in the Rajya Sabha from 2004 to 2010 and a member of the Uttar Pradesh Legislative Assembly from 1977 until 2003.

He died on 4 April 2021 at the age of 88 during his visit to Chandra Bhanu Gupta Krishi Mahavidyalaya of Bakshi Ka Talab from COVID-19.
 The last rites of Singh will not be done as he had pledged to donate his body to the King George Medical University.

References

External links
Profile on Rajya Sabha website

1930s births
2021 deaths
Samajwadi Party politicians
Rajya Sabha members from Uttar Pradesh
Members of the Uttar Pradesh Legislative Assembly
Deaths from the COVID-19 pandemic in India
Year of birth missing
Samajwadi Party politicians from Uttar Pradesh